Márcio Fernandes Figueiredo known as Márcio Fernandes (born 24 March 1962) is a Brazilian professional football manager and former player who played as a forward. He is the current manager of Paysandu.

Career statistics

Honours

Players 
 Santos
 Campeonato Paulista: 1978

 Paysandu
 Campeonato Paraense: 1981

Managers 
 Jabaquara
 Campeonato Paulista Segunda Divisão: 2002

 Red Bull Brasil
 Campeonato Paulista Série A3: 2010

 Brasiliense
 Campeonato Brasiliense: 2013

 Vila Nova
 Campeonato Goiano Série B: 2015
Campeonato Brasileiro Série C: 2015, 2020

 Remo
 Campeonato Paraense: 2019

 Paysandu
 Copa Verde: 2022

References

1962 births
Living people
Sportspeople from Santos, São Paulo
Brazilian footballers
Association football forwards
Brazilian football managers
Campeonato Brasileiro Série A managers
Campeonato Brasileiro Série B managers
Campeonato Brasileiro Série C managers
Santos FC players
Paysandu Sport Club players
Esporte Clube Santo André players
Rio Branco Atlético Clube players
Associação Ferroviária de Esportes players
Esporte Clube XV de Novembro (Piracicaba) players
Grêmio Esportivo Sãocarlense managers
Clube Atlético Bragantino managers
Santos FC managers
Fortaleza Esporte Clube managers
Red Bull Brasil managers
Comercial Futebol Clube (Ribeirão Preto) managers
Brasiliense Futebol Clube managers
Guarani FC managers
Vila Nova Futebol Clube managers
Botafogo Futebol Clube (SP) managers
Clube Atlético Linense managers
Esporte Clube XV de Novembro (Piracicaba) managers
ABC Futebol Clube managers
Joinville Esporte Clube managers
Associação Atlética Aparecidense managers
Clube do Remo managers
Esporte Clube Santo André managers
Londrina Esporte Clube managers
Paysandu Sport Club managers
Santos FC non-playing staff